Joshua Hardisty Wilkinson (14 September 1897 – 14 November 1921) was a Scottish footballer who played as a goalkeeper for Dumbarton and Rangers. He died from peritonitis at the age of 24, two days after keeping goal for Dumbarton in a "particularly rough" match against his former club Rangers in 1921.

See also
List of association footballers who died while playing

References

1897 births
1921 deaths
Scottish footballers
Footballers from Glasgow
Renton F.C. players
Dumbarton F.C. players
Rangers F.C. players
Scottish Football League players
Association football goalkeepers
Association football players who died while playing
Sport deaths in Scotland
Deaths from peritonitis
Infectious disease deaths in Scotland
People educated at Dumbarton Academy
Alumni of the University of Glasgow
Royal Naval Volunteer Reserve personnel of World War I
Royal Navy sailors